Michael Roy Sinker (called Roy; 28 September 19088 March 1994) was Archdeacon of Stow from 1963 to 1967.

Sinker was educated at Haileybury, Clare College, Cambridge and Ripon College Cuddesdon. He was ordained in 1933. After a curacy in Dalston he was Chaplain to the South African Church Railway Mission from 1935 to 1938. He then served at Bishop's Hatfield, Dalton-in-Furness, and Saffron Walden before his time as Archdeacon; and at  St Matthew, Ipswich afterwards.

Notes

1908 births
1994 deaths
Alumni of Clare College, Cambridge
People educated at Haileybury and Imperial Service College
Archdeacons of Stow
Alumni of Ripon College Cuddesdon